Yuan Huan ( 190s–210s), courtesy name Yaoqing, was an official who lived during the late Eastern Han dynasty of China. During the 190s, he served under the warlords Liu Bei, Yuan Shu and Lü Bu. After the fall of Lü Bu in 198, Yuan Huan joined Cao Cao as an adviser. He was involved in a number of policy decisions, including the administration of the tuntian policy. In the 210s, Yuan Huan was given the appointment of Prefect of the Gentlemen of the Palace (郎中令).

Yuan Huan died sometime before 220, and it is said Cao Cao wept for him. He left behind four sons, all of whom were known for their scholarly accomplishments. His descendants became one of the leading aristocratic families of the Jin dynasty and Southern dynasties.

See also
 Lists of people of the Three Kingdoms

References

 Chen, Shou (3rd century). Records of the Three Kingdoms (Sanguozhi).
 Pei, Songzhi (5th century). Annotations to Records of the Three Kingdoms (Sanguozhi zhu).

2nd-century births
210s deaths
Lü Bu and associates
Officials under Cao Cao
Yuan Shu and associates